Albert Francis Cope (–1930) was an English professional billiards and snooker player. He played in the 1927 and 1928 World Snooker Championships. In his 1927 semi-final match against Joe Davis he scored a 60 break for which he later received a commemorative certificate.

Playing career
Cope was born in Birmingham. Although primarily a billiards player, Cope was also an early exponent of snooker. In December 1913 he scored what was believed to be a world record break of 83. It included 14 reds and 14 colours. Cope was presented with "a large gold medal, suitably inscribed" to recognise the achievement.

By the time the World Snooker Championship started Cope was about 50 years old but he did play in the 1927 and 1928 events. In 1927 he beat Alec Mann before losing 16–7 to Joe Davis in the semi-final. In 1928 he played Mann again but lost this time. In his 1927 match against Joe Davis he scored a 60 break for which he later received a commemorative certificate from the Billiards Association and Control Council. The break remained the best in the World Championship until Davis made a 61 in the 1929 final. Cope died in February 1930.

Notes

References

English snooker players
English players of English billiards
1870s births
1930 deaths
Sportspeople from Birmingham, West Midlands